Col. William Henderson French House, also known as "Legend Valley Farm," is a historic home located near Athens, Mercer County, West Virginia. It was built about 1855, and is a three-story, frame dwelling with an ell with Greek Revival overtones. It sits on a sandstone foundation and features porches with small, rounded columns and railings of various designs.

It was listed on the National Register of Historic Places in 1976.

References

Houses on the National Register of Historic Places in West Virginia
Greek Revival houses in West Virginia
Houses completed in 1855
Houses in Mercer County, West Virginia
National Register of Historic Places in Mercer County, West Virginia